Ballarat railway station is located on the Serviceton line in Victoria, Australia. It serves the city of Ballarat, and it opened on 11 April 1862 as Ballarat West. It was renamed Ballarat in 1865.

The extensive building complex is of major architectural and historical significance to Ballarat; most of its original 19th-century features are intact. Preserved historic features include signal boxes, goods sheds and the largest surviving interlocking mechanical swing gates in Victoria, at Lydiard Street. It has a 19th-century arched roof spanning three tracks, and the complex is listed on the Victorian Heritage Register.

Disused stations Ballarat East, Warrenheip, Bungaree and Gordon are located between Ballarat and Ballan.

History

As part of the original railway line to Melbourne via Geelong, constructed to service the booming Ballarat goldfields, Ballarat West railway station – as it was then known – was built at a cost of almost £22,000 pounds. A bluestone engine shed was built to the south; a goods shed to the north was added in 1863. In 1877, the footbridge and waiting rooms on the south side were added. In 1885, hand-operated railway gates were added to the level crossing at Lydiard Street, together with the "B" signal box to operate it on the western side.

Extension
Following the opening of the direct line from Ballarat to Melbourne in December 1889, the increase in patronage led to plans to upgrade the station. A grand portico, stationmaster's office and clock tower were designed in 1888 and added in 1891, although no clock was installed in the tower. With the amalgamation of the Ballarat East and West Town Councils in 1921 to form the City of Ballaarat, and the closure of Ballarat East, the station gradually dropped the name Ballarat West.

Preservation
On 13 December 1981, fire badly damaged the interiors of the 1888 section, including the station-master's office, waiting room, booking office, dining room and clock tower. All of these areas were later repaired and retained. Many of the original features were restored, but some interiors, including the booking office, were subsequently modernised.

In 1983, the State Transport Authority proposed to demolish the interlocking gates at Lydiard Street. The City of Ballaarat, National Trust and Historic Buildings Council responded with a successful campaign to save the gates. A clock was added to the tower in 1984.

In 1990, conservationists succeeded in their lobbying to preserve the historic railway gates. An automated mechanical system was built to enable their continued use. Additional restoration was carried out in 2005, with the station roof replaced with quarried Welsh slate to match the original southern roof.

In 1994, the bus interchange near the station entrance was upgraded.

Second boom
Following the 2006 Regional Fast Rail project, and the introduction of V/Line's VLocity trains, as well as the reintroduction of services to Ararat in 2004, passenger numbers at Ballarat increased by as much as 40% a year. A call for a second station ensued, which became Wendouree, opening in June 2009 to alleviate congestion, mainly caused by park and ride commuters from Ballarat's outer western suburbs. A further increase in trains followed, after the resumption of services to Maryborough in 2010.

Accidents and incidents
On 30 May 2020, a VLocity passenger train, operated by V/Line, failed to stop at Ballarat, and crashed into the interlocking gates protecting the Lydiard Street North level crossing. Four men were on board the Ballarat-bound service and were injured in the collision, including the driver and conductor. The Australian Transport Safety Bureau investigated the incident, and issued a preliminary report in September 2020.

On 16 November 2021, the level crossing reopened with temporary boom barriers installed, with the interlocking gates placed in storage in nearby Wendouree. The reopening is part of a $10.5 million program to replace the signalling system around the station.

Platforms and services

Ballarat has two side platforms. It is serviced by V/Line Ballarat, Ararat and Maryborough line services.

Platform 1:
  services to Wendouree and Southern Cross
  services to Ararat and Southern Cross
  services to Maryborough

Platform 2:
  services to Wendouree 
  services to Ararat
  services to Maryborough

Transport links

Bus services
CDC Ballarat operates fourteen routes to and from Ballarat station, under contract to Public Transport Victoria:
 : to Alfredton
 : to Wendouree station
 : to Wendouree station
 : to Invermay Park
 : to Black Hill
 : to Brown Hill
 : to Canadian
 : to Buninyong
 : to Federation University Ballarat Campus
 : to Mount Pleasant
 : to Sebastopol
 : to Delacombe
 : to Alfredton
 : to Creswick

Road coaches
V/Line operates road coach services from Ballarat station to:
 Bendigo via Maryborough and Castlemaine
 Halls Gap and the Grampians National Park via Ararat and Stawell
 Horsham, Dimboola, Nhill and Adelaide
 Geelong
 Hamilton and Mount Gambier
 Ouyen, Donald and Mildura
 Warrnambool

Trails
The station is the official starting point of two multi-use trails:
 Wallaby Track, part of the Great Dividing Trail: goes to Daylesford and Buninyong
 Ballarat-Skipton Rail Trail: goes to Skipton

Gallery

Notes

References

Further reading

External links

 Rail Geelong gallery
 Victorian Railway Stations gallery
 Melway map at street-directory.com.au

Buildings and structures in Ballarat
Railway stations in Australia opened in 1862
Regional railway stations in Victoria (Australia)
Transport in Ballarat
Victorian Free Classical architecture in Australia
Victorian Heritage Register Grampians (region)